Eric Kitolano (born 2 September 1997) is a Norwegian football midfielder who plays for Molde.

Career
Kitolano started his career in Gulset IF, playing on the senior team on the sixth tier before joining the junior team of Odd in 2014. He made his senior debut for Odd in the 2016 Norwegian Football Cup, with two cup games against Tollnes and FK Tønsberg. However he was shipped out to Notodden FK, and Ull/Kisa in 2018.

In 2020 Kitolano joined Tromsø IL, helped win promotion from the 2020 1. divisjon by scoring double digits, and made his Eliteserien debut in May 2021 against Bodø/Glimt.

On 6 January 2023, Kitolano signed for Molde on a three-year contract.

Career statistics

Club

Personal life
He is the older brother of John and Joshua Kitolano.

References

1997 births
Living people
Democratic Republic of the Congo emigrants to Norway
Sportspeople from Skien
Norwegian footballers
Odds BK players
Notodden FK players
Ullensaker/Kisa IL players
Tromsø IL players
Norwegian First Division players
Eliteserien players
Association football midfielders
Norway youth international footballers